Merrymeet is a village in north of the parish of Menheniot in east Cornwall, England. Merrymeet is on the A390 main road.

During the Blitz in World War II, Merrymeet was used as a safe haven for children. 

During the night of 25th August 1940, bombs fell on many parts of Cornwall including Carclew Woods, Porth Kea, Pencale Point, Portscatho, Merrymeet, Draynes, St. Gluvias and Halton Quay, which was the only place where damage occurred. 

The village has one church - St Mary’s Church is a mission church: it was built in the early 20th century for people living in the small village of Merrymeet, giving them a place to worship that was closer than the main parish church of St Lalluwy’s in Menheniot. In 2019, it was determined that the structure of the church was in danger of becoming unsafe, and would cost around £150,000 to repair.  With the parochial church council (PCC) having no way of raising the funds itself, a public consultation was arrange to discuss its future.  This was postponed due to the coronavirus pandemic and no final decision has yet been taken about whether to close the church.

References

Villages in Cornwall